John Junkin (born 1949) is a former unionist politician in Northern Ireland.

Long active in the Ulster Unionist Party (UUP), Junkin was elected to Magherafelt District Council at the 1981 Northern Ireland local elections, and held a seat in Moyola in 1985, 1989 and 1993.  By the start of the 1990s, he was a Vice-President of the UUP, serving alongside Ken Maginnis, Martin Smyth and Hazel Bradford.

Junkin was elected to the Northern Ireland Forum in 1996, representing Mid Ulster, and held his council seat in 1997, but lost out in the 1998 Northern Ireland Assembly election, to fellow party member Billy Armstrong.

Although Junkin was re-elected to Magherafelt Council in 2001, he then resigned from the UUP and stood as an independent in 2005.  He lost his seat, defeated by new UUP candidate Jackie Crawford.  He subsequently left politics, but hit the local news in 2007 after a boat which he had fitted out for the use of an autistic child was destroyed by arson.

References

1949 births
Living people
Members of Magherafelt District Council
Independent politicians in Northern Ireland
Members of the Northern Ireland Forum
Politicians from County Londonderry
Ulster Unionist Party councillors